Lingxia is a town of Jindong District, in the southeastern suburbs of Jinhua,  Zhejiang, People's Republic of China, located near the interchange of G25 Changchun–Shenzhen Expressway with China National Highway 330 about  from downtown. , it has 34 villages under its administration.

See also 
 List of township-level divisions of Zhejiang

References 

Township-level divisions of Zhejiang